Dragan Djukić or Đukić (born 15 July 1987) is a Swiss football player who plays for SC Young Fellows Juventus.

Career
The Swiss player began his career at FC Blue Stars Zürich in 1997 and played there in the E- and D-youth. In 1999, he joined Grasshopper. In July 2006 he debut for the first team of Grasshopper; he played as substitute for Fabio Coltorti each one game at UI Cup and Swiss Super League.

After the transfer from Fabio Coltorti abode Djukic in the season 2007/08 surrogate and joined in July 2008 to FC Wohlen, in January 2009 left Wohlen and signed for SC Kriens.

International
Đukić succeeded the jump in the Swiss national team U-16 and U18. He was promoted in November 2006 at first for the Swiss U-21 team.

References

External links
Interview
football.ch

1987 births
Living people
Swiss men's footballers
Grasshopper Club Zürich players
FC Wohlen players
Swiss Super League players
Association football goalkeepers
Swiss people of Serbian descent